The Mapuche () are a group of indigenous inhabitants of south-central Chile and southwestern Argentina, including parts of Patagonia. Originally from the forests of the southern Andes, Mapuche people lived in the woods as "horticulturalists”. Mapuche populations shifted towards Argentina and Chile in the sixteenth century. The collective term refers to a wide-ranging ethnicity composed of various groups who shared a common social, religious, and economic structure, as well as a common linguistic heritage as Mapudungun speakers. Their homelands once extended from Aconcagua Valley to Chiloé Archipelago and later spread eastward to Puelmapu, a land comprising part of the Argentine pampa and Patagonia. Today the collective group makes up over 80% of the indigenous peoples in Chile, and about 9% of the total Chilean population. The Mapuche are concentrated in the Araucanía region. Many have migrated from rural areas to the cities of Santiago and Buenos Aires for economic opportunities.

The Mapuche traditional economy is based on agriculture; their traditional social organization consists of extended families, under the direction of a lonko or chief. In times of war, the Mapuche would unite in larger groupings and elect a toki (meaning "axe" or "axe-bearer") to lead them. Mapuche material culture is known for its textiles and silverwork.

At the time of Spanish arrival, the Araucanian Mapuche inhabited the valleys between the Itata and Toltén rivers. South of there, the Huilliche and the Cunco lived as far south as the Chiloé Archipelago. In the seventeenth, eighteenth and nineteenth centuries, Mapuche groups migrated eastward into the Andes and pampas, fusing and establishing relationships with the Poya and Pehuenche. At about the same time, ethnic groups of the pampa regions, the Puelche, Ranquel and northern Aonikenk, made contact with Mapuche groups. The Tehuelche adopted the Mapuche language and some of their culture, in what came to be called Araucanization, during which Patagonia came under effective Mapuche suzerainty.

Mapuche in the Spanish-ruled areas, especially the Picunche, mingled with Spanish during the colonial period, forming a mestizo population that lost its indigenous identity. But Mapuche society in Araucanía and Patagonia remained independent until the late nineteenth century, when Chile occupied Araucanía and Argentina conquered Puelmapu. Since then the Mapuche have become subjects, and later nationals and citizens of the respective states. Today, many Mapuche and Chilean communities are engaged in the so-called Mapuche conflict over land and indigenous rights in both Argentina and in Chile.

Etymology

Historically the Spanish colonizers of South America referred to the Mapuche people as Araucanians (araucanos). This term is now considered pejorative by some people, contrary for others, the importance of the term Araucanian lies in the universality of the epic work La Araucana, written by Alonso de Ercilla and the feat of that people, in the long and interminable war against the Spanish Empire. The name is probably derived from the placename rag ko (Spanish Arauco), meaning "clayey water". The Quechua word awqa, meaning "rebel, enemy", is probably not the root of araucano.

Scholars believe that the various Mapuche groups (Moluche, Huilliche, Picunche, etc.) called themselves Reche during the early Spanish colonial period, due to what they referred to as their pure native blood, derived from Re meaning pure and Che meaning people.

The name "Mapuche" is used both to refer collectively to the Picunche, Huilliche and Moluche or Nguluche from Araucanía, or at other times, exclusively to the Moluche or Nguluche from Araucanía. However, Mapuche is a relatively recent endonym meaning "People of the Earth" or "Children of the Earth", "mapu" means earth and "che" means person. It is preferred as a term when referring to the "Mapuche" people after the Arauco War.

The Mapuche identify by the geography of their territories, such as:
 Pwelche or Puelche: "people of the east" occupied Pwel mapu or Puel mapu, the eastern lands (Pampa and Patagonia of Argentina).
 Pikunche or Picunche: "people of the north" occupied Pikun-mapu, the "northern lands".
 Williche or Huilliche: "people of the south" occupied Willi mapu, the "southern lands".
 Pewenche or Pehuenche: "people of the pewen/pehuen" occupied Pewen mapu, "the land of the pewen (Araucaria araucana) tree".
 Lafkenche: "people of the sea" occupied Lafken mapu, "the land of the sea"; also known as Coastal Mapuche.
 Nagche: "people of the plains" occupied Nag mapu, "the land of the plains" (located in sectors of the Cordillera de Nahuelbuta and the low zones bordering it). Its epic and literary name is Araucanians and its old autochthonous name is Reche. The ancient Mapuche Toqui ("axe-bearer") like Lef-Traru ("swift hawk", better known as Lautaro), Kallfülikan ("blue quartz stone", better known as Caupolicán – "polished flint") or Pelontraru ("Shining Caracara", better known as Pelantaro) were Nagche.
 Wenteche: "people of the valleys" occupied Wente mapu, "the land of the valleys".

History

Pre-Columbian period 

Archaeological finds have shown that Mapuche culture existed in Chile and Argentina as early as 600 to 500 BC. Genetically the Mapuche differ from the adjacent indigenous peoples of Patagonia. This suggests a "different origin or long lasting separation of Mapuche and Patagonian populations".

Troops of the Inca Empire are reported to have reached the Maule River and had a battle with the Mapuche between the Maule and the Itata Rivers there. The southern border of the Inca Empire is believed by most modern scholars to have been situated between Santiago and the Maipo River, or somewhere between Santiago and the Maule River. Thus the bulk of the Mapuche escaped Inca rule. Through their contact with Incan invaders Mapuches would have for the first time met people with state organization. Their contact with the Incas gave them a collective awareness distinguishing between them and the invaders and uniting them into loose geo-political units despite their lack of state organization.

At the time of the arrival of the first Spaniards to Chile the largest indigenous population concentration was in the area spanning from Itata River to Chiloé Islandthat is the Mapuche heartland. The Mapuche population between Itata River and Reloncaví Sound has been estimated at 705,000–900,000 in the mid-sixteenth century by historian José Bengoa.

Arauco War

The Spanish expansion into Mapuche territory was an offshoot of the conquest of Peru. In 1541 Pedro de Valdivia reached Chile from Cuzco and founded Santiago. The northern Mapuche tribes, known as Promaucaes and Picunches, fought unsuccessfully against Spanish conquest. Little is known about their resistance.

In 1550 Pedro de Valdivia, who aimed to control all of Chile to the Straits of Magellan, campaigned in south-central Chile to conquer more Mapuche territory. Between 1550 and 1553 the Spanish founded several cities in Mapuche lands including Concepción, Valdivia, Imperial, Villarrica and Angol. The Spanish also established the forts of Arauco, Purén and Tucapel. Further efforts by the Spanish to gain more territory engaged them in the Arauco War against the Mapuche, a sporadic conflict that lasted nearly 350 years. Hostility towards the conquerors was compounded by the lack of a tradition of forced labour akin to the Inca mita among the Mapuche, who largely refused to serve the Spanish.

From their establishment in 1550 to 1598, the Mapuche frequently laid siege to Spanish settlements in Araucanía. The war was mostly a low intensity conflict. Mapuche numbers decreased significantly following contact with the Spanish invaders; wars and epidemics decimated the population. Others died in Spanish owned gold mines.
 
In 1598 a party of warriors from Purén led by Pelantaro, who were returning south from a raid in Chillán area, ambushed Martín García Óñez de Loyola and his troops while they rested without taking any precautions against attack. Almost all the Spaniards died, save a cleric named Bartolomé Pérez, who was taken prisoner, and a soldier named Bernardo de Pereda. The Mapuche then initiated a general uprising which destroyed all the cities in their homeland south of the Biobío River.

In the years following the Battle of Curalaba a general uprising developed among the Mapuches and Huilliches. The Spanish cities of Angol, Imperial, Osorno, Santa Cruz de Oñez, Valdivia and Villarrica were either destroyed or abandoned. Only Chillán and Concepción resisted Mapuche sieges and raids. With the exception of Chiloé Archipelago, all Chilean territory south of the Bíobío River was freed from Spanish rule. In this period the Mapuche Nation crossed the Andes to conquer the present Argentine provinces of Chubut, Neuquen, La Pampa and Río Negro.

Incorporation into Chile and Argentina

In the nineteenth century Chile experienced a fast territorial expansion. Chile established a colony at the Strait of Magellan in 1843, settled Valdivia, Osorno and Llanquihue with German immigrants and conquered land from Peru and Bolivia. Later Chile would also annex Easter Island. In this context Araucanía began to be conquered by Chile due to two reasons. First, the Chilean state aimed for territorial continuity and second it remained the sole place for Chilean agriculture to expand.

Between 1861 and 1871 Chile incorporated several Mapuche territories in Araucanía. In January 1881, having decisively defeated Peru in the battles of Chorrillos and Miraflores, Chile resumed the conquest of Araucanía.

Historian Ward Churchill has claimed that the Mapuche population dropped from a total of half a million to 25,000 within a generation as result of the occupation and its associated famine and disease. The conquest of Araucanía caused numerous Mapuches to be displaced and forced to roam in search of shelter and food. Scholar Pablo Miramán claims the introduction of state education during the Occupation of Araucanía had detrimental effects on traditional Mapuche education.

In the years following the occupation the economy of Araucanía changed from being based on sheep and cattle herding to one based on agriculture and wood extraction. The loss of land by Mapuches following the occupation caused severe erosion since Mapuches continued to practice a massive livestock herding in limited areas.

Modern conflict 

Land disputes and violent confrontations continue in some Mapuche areas, particularly in the northern sections of the Araucanía region between and around Traiguén and Lumaco. In 2003, the Commission for Historical Truth and New Treatments issued a report to defuse tensions calling for drastic changes in Chile's treatment of its indigenous people, more than 80% of whom are Mapuche. The recommendations included the formal recognition of political and "territorial" rights for indigenous peoples, as well as efforts to promote their cultural identities.

Though Japanese and Swiss interests are active in the economy of Araucanía, the two chief forestry companies are Chilean-owned. In the past, the firms have planted hundreds of thousands of hectares with non-native species such as Monterey pine, Douglas firs and eucalyptus trees, sometimes replacing native Valdivian forests, although such substitution and replacement is now forgotten.

Chile exports wood to the United States, almost all of which comes from this southern region, with an annual value of around $600 million. Stand.earth, a conservation group, has led an international campaign for preservation, resulting in the Home Depot chain and other leading wood importers agreeing to revise their purchasing policies to "provide for the protection of native forests in Chile". Some Mapuche leaders want stronger protections for the forests.

In recent years, the crimes committed by Mapuche armed insurgents have been prosecuted under counter-terrorism legislation, originally introduced by the military dictatorship of Augusto Pinochet to control political dissidents. The law allows prosecutors to withhold evidence from the defense for up to six months and to conceal the identity of witnesses, who may give evidence in court behind screens. Insurgent groups, such as the Coordinadora Arauco Malleco, use multiple tactics with the more extreme occurrences such as burning of homes, churches, vehicles, structures and pastures, which at times included causing deaths and threats to specific targets. As of 2005, protesters from Mapuche communities have used these tactics against properties of both multinational forestry corporations and private individuals. In 2010 the Mapuche launched a number of hunger strikes in attempts to effect change in the anti-terrorism legislation.
As of 2019, the Chilean government committed human rights abuses against the Mapuche based on Israeli military techniques and surveillance according to the French website Orin21. 

Oil exploitation and fracking in the Vaca Muerta site in Neuquen, one of the biggest shale-oil and shale-gas deposits in the world, has produced waste dumps of sludge waste, polluting the environment close to the town of Añelo, which is about 1,200km south of Buenos Aires. In 2018, the Mapuche were suing Exxon, French company TotalEnergies and Pan American Energy.

Culture 

At the time of the arrival of Europeans, the Mapuche organized and constructed a network of forts and defensive buildings. Ancient Mapuche also built ceremonial constructions such as some earthwork mounds recently discovered near Purén. Mapuche quickly adopted iron metal-working (Picunches already worked copper) Mapuche learned horse riding and the use of cavalry in war from the Spaniards, along with the cultivation of wheat and sheep.

In the 300-year co-existence between the Spanish colonies and the relatively well-delineated autonomous Mapuche regions, the Mapuche also developed a strong tradition of trading with Spaniards, Argentines and Chileans. Such trade lies at the heart of the Mapuche silver-working tradition, for Mapuche wrought their jewelry from the large and widely dispersed quantity of Spanish, Argentine and Chilean silver coins. Mapuche also made headdresses with coins, which were called trarilonko, etc.

Mapuche languages

Mapuche languages are spoken in Chile and Argentina. The two living branches are Huilliche and Mapudungun. Although not genetically related, lexical influence has been discerned from Quechua. Linguists estimate that only about 200,000 full-fluency speakers remain in Chile. The language receives only token support in the educational system. In recent years, it has started to be taught in rural schools of Bío-Bío, Araucanía and Los Lagos Regions.

Mapuche speakers of Chilean Spanish who also speak Mapudungun tend to use more impersonal pronouns when speaking Spanish.

Cosmology and beliefs

Central to Mapuche cosmology is the idea of a creator called , who is embodied in four components: an older man, an older woman, a young man and a young woman. Also, Mapuche cosmology is informed by complex notions of spirits that coexist with humans and animals in the natural world, and daily circumstances can dictate spiritual practices.

These ceremonies are often major communal events that are of extreme spiritual and social importance. Many other ceremonies are practiced, and not all are for public or communal participation but are sometimes limited to family.

It is usually filled by a woman, following an apprenticeship with an older machi, and has many of the characteristics typical of shamans. The machi performs ceremonies for curing diseases, warding off evil, influencing weather, harvests, social interactions and dreamwork. Machis often have extensive knowledge of regional medicinal herbs. As biodiversity in the Chilean countryside has declined due to commercial agriculture and forestry, the dissemination of such knowledge has also declined, but the Mapuche people are reviving it in their communities. Machis have an extensive knowledge of sacred stones and the sacred animals.

Like many cultures, the Mapuche have a deluge myth of a major flood in which the world is destroyed and recreated. In the deluge almost all humanity is drowned; the few not drowned survive through cannibalism. At last only one couple is left. A machi tells them that they must give their only child to the waters, which they do, and this restores order to the world.

Part of Mapuche ritual is prayer and animal sacrifice, required to maintain the cosmic balance. This belief has continued to current times. In 1960, for example, a machi sacrificed a young boy, throwing him into the water after an earthquake and a tsunami.

The Mapuche have incorporated the remembered history of their long independence and resistance from 1540 (Spanish and then Chileans and Argentines), and of the treaty with the Chilean and Argentine government in the 1870s. Memories, stories, and beliefs, often very local and particularized, are a significant part of the Mapuche traditional culture. To varying degrees, this history of resistance continues to this day amongst the Mapuche. At the same time, a large majority of Mapuche in Chile identify with the state as Chilean, similar to a large majority in Argentina identifying as Argentines.

Ethnobotany

Ceremonies and traditions 
 is the Mapuche New Year celebration.

Textiles

One of the best-known arts of the Mapuche is their textiles. The oldest data on textiles in the southernmost areas of the American continent (southern Chile and Argentina today) are found in some archaeological excavations, such as those of Pitrén Cemetery near the city of Temuco, and the Alboyanco site in the Biobío Region, both of Chile; and the Rebolledo Arriba Cemetery in Neuquén Province (Argentina). researchers have found evidence of fabrics made with complex techniques and designs, dated to between AD 1300–1350.

The Mapuche women were responsible for spinning and weaving. Knowledge of both weaving techniques and textile patterns particular to the locality were usually transmitted within the family, with mothers, grandmothers, and aunts teaching a girl the skills they had learned from their own elders. Women who excelled in the textile arts were highly honored for their accomplishments and contributed economically and culturally to their kinship group. A measure of the importance of weaving is evident in the expectation that a man give a larger dowry for a bride who was an accomplished weaver.

In addition, the Mapuche used their textiles as an important surplus and an exchange trading good. Numerous sixteenth-century accounts describe their bartering the textiles with other indigenous peoples, and with colonists in newly developed settlements. Such trading enabled the Mapuche to obtain those goods that they did not produce or held in high esteem, such as horses. Tissue volumes made by Aboriginal women and marketed in the Araucanía and the north of the Patagonia Argentina were really considerable and constitute a vital economic resource for indigenous families. The production of fabrics in the time before European settlement was clearly intended for uses beyond domestic consumption.

At present, the fabrics woven by the Mapuche continue to be used for domestic purposes, as well as for gift, sale or barter. Most Mapuche women and their families now wear garments with foreign designs and tailored with materials of industrial origin, but they continue to weave ponchos, blankets, bands and belts for regular use. Many of the fabrics are woven for trade, and in many cases, are an important source of income for families. Glazed pots are used to dye the wool. Many Mapuche women continue to weave fabrics according to the customs of their ancestors and transmit their knowledge in the same way: within domestic life, from mother to daughter, and from grandmothers to granddaughters. This form of learning is based on gestural imitation, and only rarely, and when strictly necessary, the apprentice receives explicit instructions or help from their instructors. Knowledge is transmitted as fabric is woven, the weaving and transmission of knowledge go together.

Clava hand-club

It has a long flat body. It has some ritual importance as a special sign of distinction carried by tribal chiefs. Many kinds of clubs are known.

This is an object associated with masculine power. It consists of a disk with attached handle; the edge of the disc usually has a semicircular recess. In many cases, the face portrayed on the disc carries incised designs. The handle is cylindrical, generally with a larger diameter at its connection to the disk.

Silverwork

In the later half of the eighteenth century Mapuche silversmiths began to produce large amounts of silver finery. The surge of silversmithing activity may be related to the 1726 parliament of Negrete that decreased hostilities between Spaniards and Mapuches and allowed trade to increase between colonial Chile and the free Mapuches. In this context of increasing trade Mapuches began in the late eighteenth century to accept payments in silver coins for their products, usually cattle or horses. These coins and silver coins obtained in political negotiations served as raw material for Mapuche metalsmiths. Old Mapuche silver pendants often included unmelted silver coins, something that has helped modern researchers to date the objects. The bulk of the Spanish silver coins originated from mining in Potosí in Upper Peru.

Mapuche silver finery was also subject to changes in fashion albeit designs associated with philosophical and spiritual concepts have not undergone major changes.

In the late eighteenth century and early nineteenth century Mapuche silversmithing activity and artistic diversity reached its climax. All important Mapuche chiefs of the nineteenth century are supposed to have had at least one silversmith. By 1984 Mapuche scholar Carlos Aldunate noted that there were no silversmiths alive among contemporary Mapuches.

Literature
The Mapuche culture of the sixteenth century had an oral tradition and lacked a writing system. Since that time, a writing system for Mapudungun was developed, and Mapuche writings in both Spanish and Mapudungun have flourished. Contemporary Mapuche literature can be said to be composed of an oral tradition and Spanish-Mapudungun bilingual writings. Notable Mapuche poets include Sebastián Queupul, Pedro Alonzo, Elicura Chihuailaf and Leonel Lienlaf.

Cogender views 
Among the Mapuche in La Araucanía, in addition to heterosexual female  shamanesses, there are homosexual male  shamans, who wear female clothing. These  were first described in Spanish in a chronicle of 1673. Among the Mapuche, "the spirits are interested in machi's gendered discourses and performances, not in the sex under the machi's clothes". The ritual transvestism of male  ... draws attention to the relational gender categories of spirit husband and  wife as a couple." As concerning "co-gendered identities" of " as co-gender specialists", it has been speculated that "female berdaches" may have formerly existed among the Mapuche.

Mapuche, Chileans and the Chilean state
Following the independence of Chile in the 1810s, the Mapuche began to be perceived as Chilean by other Chileans, contrasting with previous perceptions of them as a separate people or nation. However, not everybody agreed; 19th-century Argentine writer and president Domingo Faustino Sarmiento presented his view of the Mapuche-Chile relation by stating:

Civilizing mission discourses and scientific racism

The events surrounding the wreck of Joven Daniel at the coast of Araucanía in 1849 are considered an "inflexion point" or "point of no return" in the relations between Mapuches and the Chilean state. It cemented views of Mapuches as brutal barbarians and showed in the view of many that Chilean authorities' earlier goodwill was naive.

There are various recorded instances in the nineteenth century when Mapuches were the subject of civilizing mission discourses by elements of Chilean government and military. For example, Cornelio Saavedra Rodríguez called in 1861 for Mapuches to submit to Chilean state authority and "enter into reduction and civilization". When the Mapuches were finally defeated in 1883 president Domingo Santa María declared:

After the War of the Pacific (1879–1883) there was a rise of racial and national superiority ideas among the Chilean ruling class. It was in this context that Chilean physician Nicolás Palacios hailed the Mapuche "race" arguing from a scientific racist and nationalist point of view. He considered the Mapuche superior to other tribes and the Chilean mestizo a blend of Mapuches and Visigothic elements from Spain. The writings of Palacios became later influential among Chilean Nazis.

As result of the Occupation of Araucanía (1861–1883) and the War of the Pacific, Chile had incorporated territories with new indigenous populations. Mapuches obtained relatively favourable views as "primordial" Chileans contrasting with other indigenous peoples like the Aymara who were perceived as "foreign elements".

Contemporary attitudes

Contemporary attitudes towards Mapuches on the part of non-indigenous people in Chile are highly individual and heterogeneous. Nevertheless, a considerable part of the non-indigenous people in Chile have a prejudiced and discriminatory attitude towards Mapuche. In a 2003 study it was found that among the sample 41% of people over 60 years old, 35% of people of low socio-economic standing, 35% of the supporters of right-wing parties, 36% of Protestants and 26% of Catholics were prejudiced against indigenous peoples in Chile. In contrast, only 8% of those who attended university, 16% of supporters of left-wing parties and 19% of people aged 18–29 were prejudiced. Specific prejudices about the Mapuche are that the Mapuches are lazy and alcoholic; to some lesser degree Mapuche are sometimes judged antiquated and dirty.

In the 20th century many Mapuche women migrated to large cities to work as domestic workers. In Santiago many of these women settled in Cerro Navia and La Pintana. Sociologist Éric Fassin has called the occurrence of Mapuche domestic workers a continuation of colonial relations of servitude.

Historian Gonzalo Vial claimed that the Republic of Chile owes a "historical debt" to the Mapuche. The Coordinadora Arauco-Malleco claims to have the goal of a "national liberation" of Mapuche, with their regaining sovereignty over their own lands. Reportedly there is a tendency among female Mapuche activists to reject feminism as they consider their struggle to go beyond gender.

Mapuches and the Argentine state

19th-century Argentine authorities aiming to incorporate the Pampas and Patagonia into national territory recognized the Puelmapu Mapuche's strong connections with Chile. This gave Chile a certain influence over the Pampas. Argentine authorities feared that in an eventual war with Chile over Patagonia, Mapuches would align themselves with Chile. In this context Estanislao Zeballos published the work  (The Fifteen Thousand League Conquest) in 1878, which had been commissioned by the Argentine Ministry of War. In  Mapuches were presented as Chileans who were bound to return to Chile. Mapuches were thus indirectly considered foreign enemies. Such notion fitted well with the expansionist designs of Nicolás Avellaneda and Julio Argentino Roca for Puelmapu. The notion of Mapuches as Chileans is however an anachronism as Mapuches precede the formation of the modern state of Chile. By 1920 Argentine  revived the idea of Mapuches being Chileans, in strong contrast with 20th century scholars based in Chile such as Ricardo E. Latcham and Francisco Antonio Encina who advanced a theory that Mapuches originated east of the Andes before penetrating into what came to be Chile.

As late as 2017 Argentine historian Roberto E. Porcel wrote in a communiqué to the National Academy of History that those who often claim to be Mapuches in Argentina would be rather Mestizos, emboldened by European-descent supporters, who "lack any right for their claims and violence, not only for NOT being most of them Araucanians [sic], but also because they [the Araucanians] do not rank among our indigenous peoples".

Modern politics 
In the 2017 Chilean general election, the first two Mapuche women were elected to the Chilean Congress; Aracely Leuquén Uribe from National Renewal and Emilia Nuyado from the Socialist Party.

In popular culture
 In 2012, renowned Mapuche weaver Anita Paillamil collaborated with Chilean artist Guillermo Bert to create "Encoded Textiles," an exhibit that combined traditional mapuche textile weaving with QR Code designs.
 The 2020 Chilean-Brazilian animated film Nahuel and the Magic Book features a major characters, Fresia and Huenchur who represents her clothing attire and her tribe.
 The 4X video game Civilization VI features the Mapuche as a playable civilization (added in the Rise and Fall expansion). Their leader is Lautaro, a young Mapuche toqui known for leading the indigenous resistance against Spanish conquest in Chile and developing the tactics that would continue to be employed by the Mapuche during the long-running ArauIsab.
 The novel "Inez of my Soul" by Isabel Allende features the conquest of Chile by Pedro Valdivia, and a large part of the book deals with the Mapuche Conflict.
 The plot of the 2021 Chilean thriller film "Immersion" is a power struggle between a vacationing family and three Mapuche men.

See also 

 Guaraní people
 Flag of the Mapuches
 Guñelve

Notes

References

Bibliography
 Alvarado, Margarita (2002) "El esplendor del adorno: El poncho y el chanuntuku” En: Hijos del Viento, Arte de los Pueblos del Sur, Siglo XIX. Buenos Aires: Fundación PROA.

 Brugnoli, Paulina y Hoces de la Guardia, Soledad (1995). "Estudio de fragmentos del sitio Alboyanco". En: Hombre y Desierto, una perspectiva cultural, 9: 375–381.
 Corcuera, Ruth (1987). Herencia textil andina. Buenos Aires: Impresores SCA.
 Corcuera, Ruth (1998). Ponchos de las Tierras del Plata. Buenos Aires: Fondo Nacional de las Artes.
 Chertudi, Susana y Nardi, Ricardo (1961). "Tejidos Araucanos de la Argentina". En: Cuadernos del Instituto Nacional de Investigaciones Folklóricas, 2: 97–182.
 Garavaglia, Juan Carlos (1986). “Los textiles de la tierra en el contexto colonial rioplatense: ¿una revolución industrial fallida?”. En: Anuario IEHS, 1:45–87.
 Joseph, Claude (1931). Los tejidos Araucanos. Santiago de Chile: Imprenta San Francisco, Padre Las Casas.
 Kradolfer, Sabine, Quand la parenté impose, le don dispose. Organisation sociale, don et identité dans les communautés mapuche de la province de Neuquén (Argentine) (Bern etc., Peter Lang, 2011) (Publications Universitaires Européennes. Série 19 B: Ethnologie-générale, 71).
 Mendez, Patricia (2009a). “Herencia textil, identidad indígena y recursos económicos en la Patagonia Argentina”. En: Revista de la Asociación de Antropólogos Iberoamericanos en Red, 4, 1:11–53.
 Méndez, Patricia (2009b). “Los tejidos indígenas en la Patagonia Argentina: cuatro siglos de comercio textilI”. En: Anuario INDIANA, 26: 233–265.
 Millán de Palavecino, María Delia (1960). “Vestimenta Argentina”. En: Cuadernos del Instituto Nacional de Investigaciones Folklóricas, 1: 95–127.
 Murra, John (1975). Formaciones económicas y políticas del mundo andino. Lima: Instituto de Estudios Peruanos.
 Nardi, Ricardo y Rolandi, Diana (1978). 1000 años de tejido en la Argentina. Buenos Aires: Ministerio de Cultura y Educación, Secretaría de Estado de Cultura, Instituto Nacional de Antropología.

 Palermo, Miguel Angel (1994). "Economía y mujer en el sur argentino". En: Memoria Americana 3: 63–90.
 Wilson, Angélica (1992). Arte de Mujeres. Santiago de Chile: Ed. CEDEM, Colección Artes y Oficios Nº 3.

Further reading
'Nicholas Jose Reviews Speaking the Earth’s Languages: A Theory for Australian-Chilean Postcolonial Poetics': Cordite Poetry Review, 2014
'Fogarty & Garrido: A Bilingual Conversation between Four Poems': Cordite Poetry Review, 2012
'Trilingual Visibility in Our Transpacific: Three Mapuche Poets': Cordite Poetry Review, 2012
Language of the Land : The Mapuche in Argentina and Chile: IWGIA - IWGIA - International Work Group for Indigenous Affairs, 2007, 
When a flower is reborn : The Life and Times of a Mapuche Feminist, 2002, 
Courage Tastes of Blood : The Mapuche Community of Nicolás Ailío and the Chilean State, 1906–2001, 2005, 
Neoliberal Economics, Democratic Transition, and Mapuche Demands for Rights in Chile, 2006, 
Shamans of the Foye Tree : Gender, Power, and Healing among Chilean Mapuche, 2007, 
A Grammar of Mapuche, 2007, 

Eim, Stefan (2010). The Conceptualisation of Mapuche Religion in Colonial Chile (1545–1787): http://archiv.ub.uni-heidelberg.de/volltextserver/volltexte/2010/10717/pdf/Eim_Conceptualisation_of_Mapuche_Religion.pdf.
Faron, Louis (1961). Mapuche Social Structure, Illinois Studies in Anthropology (Urbana: University of Illinois Press).

External links 

 Mapuche International Link official website
 Mapuche-nation.org
 Rehue Foundation in Netherland
 Mapulink website
 Mapuche Health
 Website of the Kingdom of Araucania and Patagonia
 Trannie Mystics

 
Indigenous culture of the Americas
Indigenous peoples of the Southern Cone
Society of Chile
Indigenous peoples in Argentina
Indigenous peoples in Chile
Pre-Columbian cultures
Ethnic groups in Chile